Mitchell William Maier (born June 30, 1982) is an American former professional baseball outfielder, coach, and current front office executive. He is the director of baseball operations for the Kansas City Royals of Major League Baseball (MLB). He played and coached in MLB for the Royals.

Career
Maier was born in Petoskey, Michigan and played college baseball at the University of Toledo. In 2002, he played collegiate summer baseball with the Harwich Mariners of the Cape Cod Baseball League and was named a league all-star. As a junior catcher in 2003, Maier set school records with a batting average of .448, 87 hits and 61 runs batted in and tied school records with 16 doubles and 29 stolen bases. Despite this, he lost out on Mid-American Conference Baseball Player of the Year honors to Ball State's Brad Snyder. In the 2003 Major League Baseball Draft, he was a first-round selection. He was selected 30th overall by the Kansas City Royals.

He played in 51 games, batted .350 and hit two home runs. In , Maier was converted over to third base. He played for two Single-A teams in 2004, the Burlington Bees and the Wilmington Blue Rocks. In , Maier was converted to another position again, this time to the outfield, due to the presence of third base prospect Mark Teahen in the organization. He played for the Single-A High Desert Mavericks in 2005 and also played for the Double-A Wichita Wranglers.

In , Maier began the year at Double-A. He was named to the Texas League midseason All-Star team. He finished the minor league season with a .306 batting average and had 14 home runs in 138 games. Following the Wranglers elimination in the playoff finals, Maier was promoted to the major league club on September 20. He made his major league debut on September 23, .

In , Maier played for the Triple-A Omaha Royals for the entire season. He played in 140 games and batted .279 with 14 home runs.

Maier made his Major League pitching debut as the 8th Royals position player to pitch in a game on July 26, 2011, against the Boston Red Sox in Fenway Park. He pitched a scoreless inning, but gave up a double to David Ortiz.

On July 4, 2012, Maier was designated for assignment after hitting only .172 in 64 at-bats for Kansas City. On Oct. 6, 2012, Maier elected free agency. Later that month, he signed with the Red Sox on a Minor League deal for 2013.

On December 19, 2013 Maier signed a minor-league contract with the Chicago Cubs.

On March 6, 2014, Maier was released by the Cubs.
He signed a minor league deal with the Royals on May 1, 2014.

Coaching career
Maier became a coach during the 2015 season with the Royals, working as an  outfield / base running coordinator in the organization. He served as interim first base coach in 2017, and was promoted to the full-time role prior to the 2018 season.

Maier was named the Royals director of baseball operations on December 3, 2019.

References

External links

Royals coaching bio

1982 births
Living people
Arizona League Royals players
Baseball coaches from Michigan
Baseball players from Michigan
Burlington Bees players
Harwich Mariners players
High Desert Mavericks players
Kansas City Royals coaches
Kansas City Royals executives
Kansas City Royals players
Major League Baseball first base coaches
Major League Baseball outfielders
Minor league baseball coaches
Omaha Royals players
Omaha Storm Chasers players
Pawtucket Red Sox players
People from Petoskey, Michigan
Toledo Rockets baseball players
Wichita Wranglers players
Wilmington Blue Rocks players
Gigantes del Cibao players
American expatriate baseball players in the Dominican Republic